Ambala Jagadhri road is the national highway and the road in Haryana, India. The road not only connects Dual city ("Dual city" is used in Ambala) - (Ambala city and Ambala cant) with Jagadhri. The condition of road is not like a national highway due to local politics of Haryana and is considered slow moving and accident prone.

Geography
The road is maintained by Government of Haryana as it lies entirely in it. The major towns from where the highway passes are Mahesh Nagar, Saha, Kalpi, Mullana, do Sarka etc. The road runs on almost same reduced level across its length with minimum number of road curves.

Education
There are many engineering and medical colleges situated on the highway. These include Ambala College of Engineering & Applied Research, Kalpi Institute of Technology, Maharishi Markandeshwar University. Sanatan Dharma College, which was established around 1916 in Lahore in undivided India, is also situated on the highway near Ambala Cantonment (the college was uprooted during the partition of India and was reestablished in 1948 near Ambala Cant).

Transport
The transport services on the highway is controlled by Haryana State Road Transport Corporation. Buses run on the road at regular intervals every day.

See also
 Grand Trunk road

References

National Highways in Haryana
Transport in Ambala
Yamunanagar district